Scaliola is a genus of sea snails, marine gastropod mollusks in the family Scaliolidae.

Species
Species within the genus Scaliola include:
 Scaliola arenosa A. Adams
  Scaliola bella A. Adams, 1860
 Scaliola caledonica Crosse, 1870
 Scaliola elata Issel, 1869
 Scaliola glareosa A. Adams, 1862
 Scaliola gracilis A. Adams, 1862
 Scaliola lapillifera Hedley, 1899

References

 Gofas, S.; Le Renard, J.; Bouchet, P. (2001). Mollusca, in: Costello, M.J. et al. (Ed.) (2001). European register of marine species: a check-list of the marine species in Europe and a bibliography of guides to their identification. Collection Patrimoines Naturels, 50: pp. 180–213

External links
 Adams A. (1860). Mollusca Japonica: New species of Aclis, Ebala, Dunkeria, &c.. Annals and Magazine of Natural History, (3)6: 118-121

Scaliolidae